The Copa de Competencia "La Nación" (also called "Concurso por Eliminación") was an official Argentine football cup competition organized by dissident "Federación Argentina de Football" (FAF), being first held in 1913. The tournament only had two editions, the last in 1914.

The trophy took its name from local newspaper La Nación, that donated the cup for the competition. The first edition was played by 22 teams from first and second divisions competing in a single knock-out format. The "Federación Rosarina de Football" (a dissident body from the Liga Rosarina) qualified two teams to semifinal round.

The second edition increased the number of teams to 26 with no clubs from Rosario taking part of the competition before the regional body had been dissolved. Independiente and Argentino de Quilmes qualified to play the final but Argentino disafilliated from the FAF to join official body Asociación Argentina de Football shortly before the final match. Therefore, the association crowned Independiente as champion of the tournament.

Champions

Notes

References

L
Argentine Primera División
Recurring sporting events established in 1913
Recurring events disestablished in 1914
1913 establishments in Argentina